Thomas Crowley may refer to:

 Thomas Crowley (American politician) (1935–2013), American businessman and legislator in Vermont
 Thomas Crowley (Australian politician) (1901–1965), member of the Queensland Legislative Assembly
 Thomas Crowley (soldier) (1949–1995), Irishman who fought in the Croatian War of Independence